The 2003 Auckland Open (also named ASB Classic for sponsorship reasons) was a 2003 WTA Tour tennis tournament, played on outdoor hard courts. It was the 18th edition of the WTA Auckland Open. It took place at the ASB Tennis Centre in Auckland, New Zealand, from 30 December 2002 to 5 January 2003. Second-seeded Eleni Daniilidou won the singles title and earned $22,000 first-prize money.

Points and prize money

Point distribution

Prize money

* per team

Singles main-draw entrants

Seeds

1 Rankings as of 16 December 2002.

Other entrants

The following players received wildcards into the singles main draw:
  Leanne Baker
  Shelley Stephens

The following players received entry from the qualifying draw:
  Shinobu Asagoe
  Ashley Harkleroad
  Tzipora Obziler
  Renata Voráčová

Doubles main-draw entrants

Seeds

1 Rankings as of 16 December 2002.

Other entrants
The following pair received wildcards into the doubles main draw:
  Vanessa Henke /  Shelley Stephens

The following pair received entry from the qualifying draw:
  Leanne Baker /  Manisha Malhotra

Finals

Singles

 Eleni Daniilidou defeated  Cho Yoon-jeong, 6–4, 4–6, 7–6(7–2)
  It was the 1st singles title of the season for Daniilidou and the 2nd title in her career.

Doubles

 Teryn Ashley /  Abigail Spears defeated  Cara Black /  Elena Likhovtseva, 	6–2, 2–6, 6–0
  It was the 1st title for both Ashley and Spears in their respective doubles careers.

See also
 2003 Heineken Open – men's tournament

References

External links
 ITF tournament edition details
 Tournament draws

2003 WTA Tour
2003
2003 in New Zealand women's sport
January 2003 sports events in New Zealand
December 2002 sports events in New Zealand
2003 in New Zealand tennis